Zhuge Liang's Southern Campaign, also known as the War of Pacification in Nanzhong, was a military campaign which took place in 225 during the early Three Kingdoms period (220–280) of China. It was led by Zhuge Liang, the Imperial Chancellor of the state of Shu Han, against opposing forces in the Nanzhong region (covering parts of present-day Yunnan, Guizhou and southern Sichuan). The campaign was a response to rebellions started by local governors in the Nanzhong region and intrusions by the Nanman (literally: "southern barbarians").

Background
In October 222, Liu Bei, the founding emperor of Shu, lost the Battle of Xiaoting against Shu's ally-turned-rival state Wu. He died in Baidicheng (in present-day Fengjie County, Chengdu) in June 223.

Yong Kai's rebellion
Yong Kai (雍闓), a descendant of Yong Chi (雍齒) and a tribal chief active in the Nanzhong region, heard about Liu Bei's death and started a rebellion against Shu rule. He killed Zheng Ang (正昂), the Shu-appointed Administrator of Jianning Commandery (建寧郡; around present-day Qujing, Yunnan), and took Zheng Ang's successor Zhang Yi hostage. The Shu general Li Yan wrote a total of six letters to Yong Kai to dissuade him from rebelling, but Yong Kai arrogantly replied: "I heard that the sky cannot have two suns and the land cannot have two rulers. Now, from a distance away, I see that the Empire has been divided into three, so I am fearful and confused and do not know whom to pledge allegiance to."

Under urging from Shi Xie and the Wu general Bu Zhi, Yong Kai agreed to pledge allegiance to Wu and he sent Zhang Yi as a captive to the Wu emperor Sun Quan to express his sincerity. In return, Sun Quan appointed him as the Administrator of Yongchang Commandery (永昌郡; covering parts of present-day western Yunnan), which was then guarded by the Shu officials Lü Kai and Wang Kang (王伉). When Yong Kai showed up to take control of Yongchang, Lü Kai and Wang Kang refused to recognise his legitimacy and led both the local government and civilians alike to resist Yong Kai and prevent him from entering Yongchang. Yong Kai then repeatedly wrote letters to them in an attempt to convince them that he was the rightful Administrator, but Lü Kai refuted Yong Kai's claims and managed to retain control over Yongchang because the people of Yongchang highly regarded and trusted him.

Rebellions by Gao Ding and Zhu Bao
Around 223, as Shu was still mourning Liu Bei's death, Zhuge Liang, the Imperial Chancellor and regent of Shu, decided to focus on domestic policy to promote stability and accumulate resources before using military force to quell the uprisings in the Nanzhong region. At the same time, he also sent Deng Zhi and Chen Zhen as diplomats to Wu to meet Sun Quan and convince him to make peace with Shu and rebuild the Shu–Wu alliance against their rival state, Wei.

In the meantime, Gao Ding (高定; or Gao Dingyuan 高定元), the chief of the Sou tribe (叟族) in Yuexi/Yuesui Commandery (越巂郡; around present-day Xichang, Sichuan) heard about Yong Kai's rebellion and decided to join, so he killed Jiao Huang (焦璜), the Administrator of Yuexi/Yuesui appointed by the Shu government. While Zhuge Liang was planning for a military campaign against the rebels, he appointed Gong Lu as the new Administrator of Yuexi/Yuesui and sent him there to make preparations in advance. However, Gong Lu ended up being killed by Gao Ding.

Around the same time, Zhuge Liang also sent an official, Qi Xing (頎行), to conduct an investigation in Zangke Commandery (牂柯郡; around present-day Guiyang or Fuquan, Guizhou). Upon arriving in Zangke, Qi Xing detained all the lower-ranked officials for questioning. Zhu Bao (朱褒), the Shu-appointed Administrator (太守) of Zangke, had heard of the rebellions in the neighbouring Jianning and Yuexi/Yuesui commanderies, so he killed Qi Xing and joined the rebels.

Involvement of Meng Huo and the Nanman
After failing to capture Yongchang Commandery from Lü Kai and Wang Kang, Yong Kai turned to the Nanman tribes for help but they were unwilling to listen to him. Yong Kai then sought help from Meng Huo, a local leader with much influence and popularity among the Nanman. Meng Huo lied to the Nanman that Shu's government had made unreasonable demands from them and successfully incited them to rebel against Shu's rule.

Pacifying Nanzhong
In the spring of 225, after Shu rebuilt its alliance with Wu against their rival state Wei, Zhuge Liang, the Imperial Chancellor of Shu, personally led Shu imperial forces south to pacify the Nanzhong region and quell the rebellions. Wang Lian, Zhuge Liang's chief clerk, attempted to dissuade him from participating in the campaign, but Zhuge Liang insisted because he was worried that the Shu generals might not be competent enough to deal with the rebels on their own.

Ma Su, a close aide of Zhuge Liang, suggested that they focus on psychological warfare (i.e. winning the hearts of the people in Nanzhong) rather than conventional warfare, so as to prevent rebellions from breaking out again. Zhuge Liang readily accepted Ma Su's advice.

The Shu emperor Liu Shan awarded Zhuge Liang a ceremonial axe and held a grand ceremony to see him off on the campaign: attendants bearing parasols made of feathers walked in front of and behind him, an entourage of 60 huben imperial guards escorted him, while drums rolled and trumpets blared in the background.

The Shu army travelled along a water route from Anshang County (安上縣; present-day Pingshan County, Sichuan) to Yuexi/Yuesui Commandery and entered the Nanzhong region. In response, Gao Ding and Yong Kai constructed several forts in Maoniu (旄牛; present-day Hanyuan County, Sichuan), Dingze (定筰; present-day Yanyuan County, Sichuan) and Beishui (卑水; southeast of present-day Zhaojue County, Sichuan) counties. Zhuge Liang then led the Shu army to Beishui County, where he hoped the rebels would converge so that he could defeat all of them in one battle. During this time, Gao Ding's subordinate(s) killed Yong Kai. Zhuge Liang then used the opportunity to strike back and defeated Gao Ding. Gao Ding was subsequently captured and executed by beheaded on the orders of Zhuge Liang.

Zhuge Liang then ordered Ma Zhong to lead troops southeast from Bodao County (僰道縣; present-day Yibin, Sichuan) to attack Zangke Commandery, and Li Hui to lead troops southwest from Pingyi County (平夷縣; northeast of present-day Bijie, Guizhou) to attack Jianning Commandery. When Li Hui reached Kunming, he lost contact with Zhuge Liang and ended up being surrounded by the rebels, who had twice as many men as he did. Li Hui then lied to the rebels, saying that he actually wanted to join them. Just as the rebels believed him and lowered their guard, he used the opportunity to strike back and move south to Panjiang (槃江) to meet up with Ma Zhong, who had just defeated Zhu Bao's rebel forces and recaptured Zangke. Ma Zhong and Li Hui's units rendezvoused with Zhuge Liang's main army and prepared to attack Meng Huo, who incorporated the remnants of the rebel forces into his own.

Zhuge Liang knew that Meng Huo was popular and respected among the locals in the Nanzhong region, so he wanted to let him live. After Meng Huo was captured, Zhuge Liang showed him around the Shu camp and asked him what he thought. Meng Huo replied: "Before this, I knew nothing about your army, which was why I lost. Now that you have shown me around your camp, I know the conditions of your army and will be able to defeat you easily." Zhuge Liang laughed, released him and allowed him to return for another battle. The same cycle repeated for a total of seven times. On the seventh time, Meng Huo surrendered and told Zhuge Liang: "Sir, you have shown me Heaven's might. The people of the south will never rebel again." Zhuge Liang then led his forces towards Dian Lake in triumph.

Aftermath
After pacifying the four commanderies of Yizhou (益州; a.k.a. Jianning 建寧), Yongchang (永昌), Zangke (牂柯) and Yuexi/Yuesui (越巂), Zhuge Liang reformed the administrative divisions to create another two commanderies, Yunnan (雲南) and Xinggu (興古), to improve the quality of the local governments in the Nanzhong region. He wanted to allow the people to self-govern those lands instead of appointing non-locals as the governors. He pointed out the problems with leaving non-locals in charge: The people in Nanzhong had recently lost their loved ones in the battles and might still harbour bitter feelings towards the Shu government; if they had non-locals to govern them, they might feel even more resentful and choose to rebel again; if non-locals were put in charge, the Shu government would need to station troops in the area to protect them.

Before completely withdrawing all Shu soldiers from the Nanzhong region, Zhuge Liang told Meng Huo and the other local leaders that he only required them to pay tribute to the Shu government in the form of gold, silver, oxen, warhorses, etc. He appointed locals such as Li Hui (from Jianning Commandery) and Lü Kai (from Yongchang Commandery) as commandery administrators. These commandery administrators were different from their predecessors in the sense that they only served as representatives of the Shu government in the region; the locals were governed by their respective local leaders and tribal chiefs.

More than ten thousand families of the Qiang (羌) tribes clans along with other strong foreigners from Nanzhong were moved deeper into the Shu region and reorganized into five divisions. Since no enemy could resist them, they were nicknamed the Flying Army (無當飛軍). The rest of the foreigners were divided into the great clans of Nanzhong, those were: Jiao(焦), Yong(雍), Lou(婁), Cuan(爨), Meng(孟), Liang(量), Mao(毛) and Li(李). They were put under the command of the Five Commandants also called the Five Lords. The people of Nanzhong referred to them as the Four Clans and the Five Lords.

Since many among the foreigners didn't want to be under them or enrich these great clans, the local prefect puts forward the policy to offer them gold and silks and encourage trading to persuade those people to develop themselves as family divisions with many among them securing important hereditary positions. This policy motivates the tribal people to gather rare resources and progressively brought them under the control of the Han government until they became Han subjects.

After his campaign, Zhuge Liang recruited many talented people among the foreign leaders such as Cuan Xi (爨習) of Jianning Commandary, Meng Yan (孟琰) of Zhuti Commandary and Meng Huo became his subordinates. Cuan Xi highest office was General Who Leads The Army; Meng Yan became General Who Maintains Han while Meng Huo became a Minister to the Imperial Secretary.

Many resources were taken from Nanzhong such as gold, silver, cinnabar and lacquer while plow oxen and war horses were used to support the army and the State moreover the commanders often recruited among the local people.

The people in Nanzhong never rebelled against Shu rule again for as long as Zhuge Liang was still alive. Historical books show that there were occasional revolts in this area. However, the rebellion in the region was quelled at the local government level appointed by Zhuge Liang, unlike before.  In addition, Zhuge Liang's expedition was generally successful, given the record that local influential people who were cooperative with Shu Han stabilized the area and provided Shu Han with abundant supplies and manpower.

In Romance of the Three Kingdoms
Although historical records mentioned that Zhuge Liang captured and released Meng Huo a total of seven times throughout the campaign, no details were provided. The 14th-century historical novel Romance of the Three Kingdoms, which romanticises the events before and during the Three Kingdoms period, spends a total of about four-and-a-half chapters (87 to 91) fleshing out the details of each of the seven battles. It includes numerous fictional characters associated with Meng Huo, such as Lady Zhurong (Meng Huo's wife), Meng You (Meng Huo's brother) and other Nanman chieftains such as King Mulu and King Duosi. Apart from this, in the novel, the Shu generals Zhao Yun, Wei Yan and Ma Dai actively participate in the campaign, even though historically there is no mention about their involvement.

 First battle: Zhao Yun leads his troops to attack Meng Huo and defeats his army. Wei Yan captures Meng Huo and brings him before Zhuge Liang. When Meng Huo complains that he was captured through trickery, Zhuge Liang releases him and allows him to return for another battle.
 Second battle: Meng Huo builds a series of fortifications across a river and taunts the Shu forces to attack him. Ma Dai cuts off his supply route and kills Jinhuan Sanjie, Meng Huo's subordinate who was protecting the river fortifications. Ahuinan and Dongtuna, two of Meng Huo's subordinates, betray their master, capture him and hand him over as a prisoner to Zhuge Liang. Like before, Meng Huo complains that he did not had a chance to fight the enemy fair and square. Zhuge Liang then shows him around the Shu camp before releasing him.
 Third battle: Meng Huo's younger brother Meng You pretends to surrender to Zhuge Liang and promises to lure Meng Huo into a trap. However, Zhuge Liang knows it is a ploy so he also pretends to play along, captures both of them in the trap, and releases them again.
 Fourth battle: When Meng Huo hears that the Shu army is planning to retreat, he gathers all his troops and attacks the Shu camp. He falls into the pit traps in the camp and ends up being captured again. Zhuge Liang releases him once more.
 Fifth battle: Meng Huo, having learnt his lesson from his previous defeats, adopts a more defensive stance. He lures the Shu forces into the poisonous marshes around the caves of his ally, King Duosi. However, Zhuge Liang manages to avoid the dangers of the marshes with the help of Meng Jie, Meng Huo's elder brother who does not participate in Meng Huo's rebellion against Shu. The Shu forces then defeat and kill King Duosi and capture Meng Huo again. Like before, Zhuge Liang releases Meng Huo again.
 Sixth battle: Meng Huo's wife Lady Zhurong joins the battle and captures the Shu generals Ma Zhong and Zhang Ni. Ma Dai defeats Lady Zhurong later and captures her. Zhuge Liang releases Lady Zhurong in exchange for Ma Zhong and Zhang Ni. Meng Huo then turns to his ally King Mulu for help. King Mulu has the ability to control wild animals and direct them in battle. However, the Shu army is prepared for this and they use fire-breathing contraptions (referred to as juggernauts in some translations) to scare away the animals. King Mulu is killed in battle and Meng Huo ends up being captured again, but Zhuge Liang releases him once more.
 Seventh battle: Meng Huo turns to another ally, Wutugu, for help. Wutugu's soldiers wear a special type of armour made of rattan which can deflect sharp blades and arrows. Zhuge Liang comes up with a plan for Wei Yan to lure Wutugu and his army into a trap in a valley, where explosives and fire traps have been set. The flammable rattan armour catches fire easily and Wutugu and his army completely perish in the valley. Meng Huo is captured once more. This time, he feels ashamed of himself and decides to surrender to Zhuge Liang and swear allegiance to Shu for the rest of his life.

In popular culture
A popular legend tells of how Zhuge Liang invented the mantou, a kind of steamed bun, during this campaign. It probably rose from the fact that the name mantou is homonymous with mantou. The story tells that, on the way back after the campaign, Zhuge Liang and the Shu army came to a swift-flowing river which defied all attempts to cross it. Locals informed him that he must sacrifice 50 men and throw their heads into the river to appease the river deity, who will then allow them to cross. As Zhuge Liang did not want to cause further bloodshed, he ordered buns shaped roughly like human heads – round with a flat base – to be made and thrown into the river. After a successful crossing, he named the bun "barbarian's head", which evolved into the present-day mantou.

The southern campaign has been reenacted in a number of video games, including Koei's Dynasty Warriors series and Sangokushi Koumeiden. Both follow the events described in the historical novel Romance of the Three Kingdoms, and the player can defeat Meng Huo up to seven times. A whole chapter (out of five) is dedicated to this campaign in Sangokushi Koumeiden.

References

 Chang, Qu ( 4th century). Chronicles of Huayang (Huayang Guo Zhi).
 Chen, Shou (3rd century). Records of the Three Kingdoms (Sanguozhi).
 Luo, Guanzhong (14th century). Romance of the Three Kingdoms (Sanguo Yanyi).
 Pei, Songzhi (5th century). Annotations to Records of the Three Kingdoms (Sanguozhi zhu).
 

220s conflicts
Campaigns of the Three Kingdoms
225